The Uncle from America is a 1953 West German comedy film directed by Carl Boese and starring Hans Moser, Georg Thomalla and Joe Stöckel. It was based on a play by Ferdinand Altenkirch which had previously been made into the 1932 film No Money Needed.

It was shot at the Spandau Studios in Berlin. The film's sets were designed by the art director Erich Grave and Walter Kutz.

Cast

References

External links

1953 comedy films
German comedy films
West German films
Films directed by Carl Boese
German films based on plays
Remakes of German films
Films shot at Spandau Studios
German black-and-white films
1950s German films
1950s German-language films